Lyndsey Rodrigues (born 23 July 1981) is an Australian TV host, actress and former MTV VJ, known as a co-host of the MTV TV series Total Request Live. She has also hosted other MTV programs, such as Escape from Oz: The Real World Sydney Reunion, Trim the Fat: The Gauntlet III Reunion and The Real World Hollywood: Reunion.

She is of Portuguese and British descent.

Career
After the cancellation of Total Request Live, Rodrigues appeared on TV and radio programs in her native Australia, including three 2009 episodes of AFHV: World’s Funniest Videos, and Channel Nine's lifestyle show What's Good For You. She also reported the weather on Channel Nine News with Peter Overton.

In 2009 she co-hosted the Logies Red Carpet with Jules Lund and Shelley Craft as well as appearing on the cover of Men's Style Magazine and in a 6-page spread where she appears topless.

She played Guy Sebastian's love interest in the "Like It Like That" music video, as well as being in the inaugural advertising campaign for V Australia.

Rodrigues has also hosted Breakfast Radio for both Mix 106.5 and Edge 96.1.

In June 2010 it was announced that Rodrigues had been appointed the new Music and Entertainment presenter for BigPond Entertainment, a return to her original love of all things music. Chris Taylor, former Director of Telstra Media, said that Rodrigues's new role would see her interviewing the celebrities of the music, entertainment and fashion world.

Rodrigues currently resides in New York City, working as a model, TV host and actress.

Rodrigues is the host of Hello Style and Cosmo's series "Sexy vs Skanky" as well as the New York correspondent for Axs Live TV.

She is also the host of Hello Style Live and frequently hosts other live events throughout New York City.

On 25 July 2018, Rodrigues hosted the first HQ Trivia Australian edition.

References

External links
Official Website

Australian VJs (media personalities)
Australian television presenters
Actresses from Sydney
Australian people of British descent
Australian people of Portuguese descent
Living people
Australian music critics
Australian women music critics
Australian music journalists
Australian women journalists
1981 births
Australian women television presenters